August Samuel Bergamo (February 14, 1917 – August 19, 1974) was a Major League Baseball outfielder who played for the St. Louis Cardinals in 1944 and 1945.  A native of Detroit, Michigan, he stood 5'9" and weighed 165 lbs.

Bergamo is one of many ballplayers who only appeared in the major leagues during World War II.  He was a valuable reserve on the 1944 World Series Champions, batting .286 in 80 games.  He was the starting left fielder in World Series Game 2 against the St. Louis Browns, won by the Cards 3–2 in 11 innings. Bergamo, the leadoff hitter, was 0-for-5 in the game but hit an RBI grounder in the third that plated the first Cardinal run.  For the Series he appeared in three games, going 0-for-6 with one RBI and two walks.

In 1945, he batted .316 in 94 games, but St. Louis finished second that year, three games behind the Chicago Cubs.

Career totals for 174 games played include a .304 batting average (151-for-496), 5 home runs, 63 runs batted in, 86 runs scored, a .400 on-base percentage, and a slugging average of .401. Defensively, he recorded a .977 fielding percentage.

External links
Baseball Reference
Retrosheet

1917 births
1974 deaths
St. Louis Cardinals players
Baseball players from Detroit
Major League Baseball right fielders
Columbus Red Birds players
Rochester Red Wings players
Louisville Colonels (minor league) players
Minneapolis Millers (baseball) players
Birmingham Barons players
Chattanooga Lookouts players
Syracuse Chiefs players
Kansas City Blues (baseball) players